Chacha ( ch’ach’a ) is a Georgian pomace brandy, clear and strong (ranging between 50% alcohol for commercially produced to 85% for home brew), which is sometimes called "wine vodka", "grape vodka", or "Georgian vodka/grappa". It is made of grape pomace (grape residue left after making wine). The term chacha is used in Georgia to refer to grape distillate. It may be also produced from unripe or wild grapes. Other common fruits or herbs used are figs, tangerines, oranges, mulberries or tarragon.

Traditionally only a homebrewed drink of Georgians, it is today commonly produced by professional distillers and most wineries who include it in their product range. One of the most famous chacha products is the Binekhi Estragon, which became distinguished with the silver medal at the 2007 Mundus Vini awards.

Many Georgians claim chacha has medicinal properties and is suggested as a remedy for a number of ailments, including ear blockages and indigestion.  Also, it is claimed to cure stomach aches by applying it to the abdomen. It is also claimed to cure acne by applying to the face.

References

External links
"Hvino News" - wine news from Republic of Georgia
Wines and Spirits of Georgia
Georgian Chacha 

Pomace brandies
Cuisine of Georgia (country)
Georgian vodkas
Georgian words and phrases
Georgian products with protected designation of origin